The Communist Party of Pakistan (abbr. CPP) is a communist party in Pakistan.

History

Founding
The CPP was founded in Calcutta, India, soon after the establishment of Pakistan on 6 March 1948. A decision was taken at the 2nd Congress of the Communist Party of India, which was held in Calcutta at that time, that a separate communist party ought to be created in the new state of Pakistan. It was thought that Pakistan, being a relatively small country (in comparison to India) and suffering from instability, was ripe for revolution. The delegates from Pakistan separated themselves and held a separate session where they constituted the CPP. Sajjad Zaheer (founder of the All-India Progressive Writers Association), from West Pakistan, was elected General-Secretary. The delegates from East Pakistan elected an East Pakistan Provincial Committee. Many Muslim leaders of the CPI were sent to Pakistan to help with the formation of the party.

Plotting to overthrow government
The party continued its political activities in a clandestine way soon after formation. It was banned in July 1954 on charges of plotting to overthrow the then government of Prime Minister Liaqat Ali Khan. The famous case, Rawalpindi Conspiracy case was registered in 1951 against the coup plotters and crackdown launched. against its leadership throughout the country.

Goals
The attempt to start a revolution in Pakistan failed and the CPP leaders were jailed. In the 1951 Rawalpindi Conspiracy Case, many leading members were convicted and the party was forcibly repressed by successive governments.

Struggles
Diplomatic intervention by Jawaharlal Nehru led to the most prominent CPP leaders being freed and sent back to India. At this stage, the CPP was in poor shape in West Pakistan, while in East Pakistan the party had a limited foundation. However, it was difficult to have a unified underground political organization spanning such a vast geographical territory and the East Pakistan branch was able to operate with autonomy.

1950s
In the provincial elections in East Pakistan in 1954, the CPP supported the United Front launched by the Awami League, Krishak Praja Party, and the Nizam-e-Islam party. Four out of ten CPP candidates were elected, and 23 CPP members were elected as candidates of other parties.

In 1954 the party and its front organizations such as the National Students Federation, Progressive Writers' Movement and Railway Workers' Union were banned. As a result, the CPP launched the Azad Pakistan Party (APP) in West Pakistan with Mian Iftikhar-ud-Din as a leader. In 1957, the CPP and other leftists created the National Awami Party as a legal party. The APP merged into the NAP.

In East Pakistan, the CPP worked within the Awami League and then in Ganatantri Dal.
In 1958 the Kull Pakistan Kissan Association (All Pakistan Peasants Association) was launched.

1960s
In the mid-1960s the US State Department estimated the party membership to be approximately 3000. The CPP also began to organize themselves abroad. In Europe, the CPP branch published the Urdu magazine Baghawat, which translates as "rebellion".

In 1966 the Sino-Soviet split reached the CPP. In East Pakistan a pro-Chinese group broke away from the CPP.
At the fourth party congress in Dhaka in 1968, a decision was taken that a separate communist party should be formed for East Pakistan. Thus the Communist Party of East Pakistan (CPEP) was founded. The CPEP later became the Communist Party of Bangladesh.

The CPP organized a militant and armed peasants struggle in Patfeeder, Baluchistan. The CPP resisted the autocratic regimes of the times, and built up militant trade union movements.

1990s
In December 1990 Jam Saqi became general secretary of the party. In April 1991, he resigned from the party. In 1995 the CPP merged with the Major Ishaque faction of the Mazdoor Kissan Party to form the Communist Mazdoor Kissan Party (CMKP). The CPP accepted the criticism that they had been too uncritical towards the Soviet Union. However, in 1999 a group broke away from the CMKP and reconstituted the CPP. In 2002, the CPP split, leading to the existence of two separate CPPs, one led by Maula Bux Khaskheli and a splinter group led by Khadim Thaheem.

Current status

The party hasn't been registered in Pakistan.

Electoral history

See also
 Politics of Pakistan
 List of political parties in Pakistan
 List of communist parties

References

 
Far-left politics in Pakistan
1947 establishments in Pakistan
Political parties established in 1947
International Meeting of Communist and Workers Parties